Matthew Robert Ralph d'Ancona (born 27 January 1968) is an English journalist.  A former deputy editor of The Sunday Telegraph, he was appointed editor of The Spectator in February 2006, a post he retained until August 2009.

Early life and education
D'Ancona's father was a Maltese tennis champion of Italian descent who moved to England to study and played youth football for Newcastle United before becoming a civil servant. His mother was an English teacher. D'Ancona was educated at St Dunstan's College, an independent school for boys (now co-educational) in Catford in south London, where he was head boy.  He also won an essay-writing competition run by The Observer on the subject of the future of British industry. He went to Magdalen College at the University of Oxford, where he took the top First in Modern History for his year in 1989. The same year, he was elected a fellow of All Souls College, Oxford.

Life and career
After a year studying medieval confession, d'Ancona joined the magazine Index on Censorship, before proceeding to The Times as a trainee. There he rose swiftly to become education correspondent and then assistant editor at the age of 26.

He joined The Sunday Telegraph in 1996 as deputy comment editor and columnist, before becoming deputy editor. He wrote a weekly political column in The Sunday Telegraph for a decade; the column was "treated as the best insight into Cameronism by Conservative MPs". He succeeded Boris Johnson as editor of The Spectator. On 28 August 2009 it was announced that d'Ancona would be stepping down as editor to be replaced by Fraser Nelson.

While not himself a believer, d'Ancona is also the co-author of two books on early Christian theology, The Jesus Papyrus  and The Quest for the True Cross. He has written three novels, Going East, Tabatha's Code and Nothing to Fear. D'Ancona has also written several articles for the British political magazine Prospect.

In January 2015, d'Ancona joined The Guardian as a weekly columnist. He left the paper in 2019. He also writes columns for the Evening Standard, GQ and The New York Times, and is an editor of Tortoise Media.

He is chairman of the liberal Conservative think tank, Bright Blue, a trustee of the Science Museum and a Visiting Research Fellow at Queen Mary University of London.

Bibliography

References

External links
Journalisted - Articles written by Matthew d'Ancona

Living people
1968 births
Alumni of Magdalen College, Oxford
English male journalists
English magazine editors
Fellows of All Souls College, Oxford
People educated at St Dunstan's College
The Spectator editors
British people of Maltese descent